Mupe Bay is a bay with a shingle beach to the east of Lulworth Cove in Dorset, England, and is part of the Jurassic Coast World Heritage Site.

The bay exposes a sequence of Cretaceous rocks from the Bindon Hill Chalk in the north through the Wealden Beds to the Purbeck Beds in the south at Mupe Rocks.

Mupe Bay is only accessible when the Lulworth Ranges are open to the public. It can be reached by a  walk from the car park at Lulworth Cove.

To the south are Mupe Ledges and out to sea Mupe Rocks.

Black Rock is located at the eastern end of the bay.

See also
 List of Dorset beaches

References

External links
 Ian West's Geology of the Wessex Coast Field Guide, including photographs

Bays of Dorset
Jurassic Coast